The Kauffman Center for the Performing Arts is a performing arts center in downtown Kansas City, Missouri, USA, at 16th and Broadway, near the Power & Light District, the T-Mobile Center and the Crossroads Arts District. Its construction was a major part of the ongoing redevelopment of downtown Kansas City.

The Center was created as a 501(c)(3) non-profit organization. Unlike some other major civic construction projects, no taxpayer funds went into its construction. The City of Kansas City contributed to and operates a parking garage adjacent to the Kauffman Center.

It is the performance home to the Kansas City Symphony, the Lyric Opera of Kansas City, and the Kansas City Ballet which in the past performed at the Lyric Theatre, eight blocks north of the center. The Kauffman Center houses two unique performance venues: Muriel Kauffman Theatre and Helzberg Hall.

According to its website, the Kauffman Center's mission is "to enrich the lives of communities throughout the region, country and world by offering extraordinary and diverse performing arts experiences". Not only do notable performances take place almost weekly, but the Center is a place where the KC community comes together and celebrates the city's rich arts culture.
The Kauffman Center seeks to fulfill this mission by offering a wide selection of performances, and also by offering specific programs to connect with the youth in the Kansas City area.

Construction

Origins
Muriel McBrien Kauffman first discussed her idea for a performing arts center in Kansas City with her family and the community in 1994. After her death the following year, her daughter and chairman of the Muriel McBrien Kauffman Foundation, Julia Irene Kauffman, began to move the project forward. A feasibility study was conducted in 1997; it resulted in a report that gave Julia Irene Kauffman and the rest of the board a practical foundation on which they could begin to build Muriel Kauffman's vision.

In 1999, the Muriel McBrien Kauffman Foundation purchased an 18.5-acre plot of land just south of the central business district. The Foundation announced that this site would be the home of the proposed performing arts center. By 2000, the then-named Metropolitan Kansas City Performing Arts Center board had narrowed down the pool of potential architects to four. They ultimately chose Moshe Safdie, an award-winning modernist known for such buildings as Habitat 67 in Montreal, Canada; the Khalsa Heritage Centre in India; the Marina Bay Sands resort in Singapore; and the Crystal Bridges Museum of American Art in Bentonville, Arkansas. Soon after, he arrived in Kansas City to see the site for himself, and while at dinner with Julia Irene Kauffman he sketched an idea for the center on his napkin. Soon, that sketch would evolve into an architectural icon and the home for performing arts in Kansas City.

Safdie presented his plan in May 2002, and four years later, on October 6, 2006, ground was broken for what had now been officially named the Kauffman Center for the Performing Arts.

Design and construction

The technical requirements and exacting standards required of a facility like the Kauffman Center made it one of the most complex structures in the world to design and build. The building, which took nearly five years to complete, contains 40,000 square feet of glass, 25,000 cubic yards of concrete, and 27 steel cables. The main lobby, Brandmeyer Great Hall, is built of a glass ceiling and sloping glass walls that provide a panoramic view of Kansas City to the south. The twenty-seven steel cables on the south façade are anchored in embeds that weigh approximately one and a half tons, and the embeds are an extension of the foundation and bedrock beneath the building. When the steel cables were pulled taut during the construction process, the entire steel structure shifted two to six inches to the south. This tensioning provides stability to the structure and keeps the glass lobby securely in place. The Kauffman Center covers 13 acres (53,000 m2), including landscaped grounds over the 1,000-space, city-owned Arts District Garage. The cost of the project was approximately $413 million, which includes both a $40 million operating endowment and the city's $47 million construction of the parking garage. The Kauffman Center was designed by lead architect Moshe Safdie, acoustician Yasuhisa Toyota, theater consultant Theatre Projects Consultants and Richard Pilbrow, and engineering firm Arup. Local firm BNIM was the associate architect. Lead contractor was J.E. Dunn Construction Group of Kansas City.

Architecture

The center's exterior consists of two symmetrical half shells of vertical, concentric arches that open toward the south. Each shell houses one acoustically independent performance venue, although the backstage area is shared. The south façade of the Center is made entirely of glass. Safdie describes the lobby as "an expansive glazed porch contained by a glass tent-like structure".  For those inside Brandmeyer Great Hall, the glass puts Kansas City on display; for those on the outside, the Kauffman Center becomes like a terrarium, revealing the thousands of attendees backlit against the white interior.

Performance facilities
The  Kauffman Center for the Performing Arts houses two performance halls: Muriel Kauffman Theatre and Helzberg Hall. The venues share backstage space that runs the entire length of the Kauffman Center. There are dressing rooms that can accommodate more than 250 performers, along with 11 rehearsal rooms. The Kauffman Center joins the Lincoln Center as another of the few performing arts centers in the country to have two (or more) performance venues in one building. Another example is the Kennedy Center in Washington, D.C.

This decision to have two halls, each tailored to a specific purpose, rather than a multipurpose building, reminded many Kansas City residents of a similar decision in the 1970s—when Ewing Kauffman and city officials decided to build separate stadiums for the Kansas City Chiefs and the Kansas City Royals, rather than a single arena for both. Both stages have been rented out for private events, and the lobby features floor-to-ceiling windows, along with state-of-the-art refreshment stands, gift shop and architecturally invigorating staircases.

The Muriel Kauffman Theatre is a 1,800-seat theater whose design was inspired by the great European opera houses. With multiple balconies and box seating on either side of the theater, attendees are much closer to the stage than in most other auditorium-type venues. The balconies and boxes, which feature seats covered in various shades of red, also boast balustrades that glimmer with gold lighting and dim when the performance begins. The undulating walls of the theatre are painted with a brightly colored mural, designed and carried out by students at the Kansas City Art Institute, under the guidance of Moshe Safdie. With a 5,000-square-foot stage, an orchestra pit that can house up to 90 musicians, and a 74-foot tall fly tower, Muriel's Theatre is the performance home of the Kansas City Ballet and the Lyric Opera of Kansas City, as well as the site of many other theatrical, musical, and dance productions. Another feature of the Muriel Kauffman Theatre is the installation of the Figaro Simultext Seatback System, which displays subtitles in various languages on the backs of chairs, as opposed to most other opera houses that require the audience to look above the stage for opera translations.

Helzberg Hall is a 1,600-seat, oval-shaped concert hall, and it is the performance home to the Kansas City Symphony. Because the stage extends into approximately one-third of the space, even the seat farthest from the stage is a mere 100 feet away. Helzberg Hall features vineyard-style seating on all four sides of the stage, adding to the intimate feel of the space. Safdie explains it thus: "From the outset, we wanted a hall that was intimate and in which the public is engaged with the musicians in a feeling of embrace."  Within the stage itself are motorized risers, which can either lie flat or rise into a tier, depending on the needs of the performance. Helzberg Hall also houses a 79-stop, 102-rank pipe organ built by the firm Casavant Frères in Saint-Hyacinthe, Quebec, Canada. Fewer than 10 percent of the 5,548 pipes are visible to those in the hall. The largest pipe is 32 feet tall and weighs approximately 960 pounds. After the two-month installation process, and an additional two-month tuning period, the organ was dedicated on March 10, 2012 with a special concert by James David Christie.

 
Brandmeyer Great Hall links Muriel Kauffman Theatre and Helzberg Hall, and features an expansive view of the Kansas City skyline to the south. It serves as a lobby for patrons on performance nights and is also available for special events. The pristine white great hall provides access to the performance halls by a series of stacking, open balconies. This means that on performance nights, patrons attending events in either hall are visible to each other, as well as to the city below.

Opening
The Grand Opening celebration of the Kauffman Center for the Performing Arts took place the weekend of September 16 – 18, 2011.
The Friday night celebration, entitled "An Evening of Theatrical Delights", inaugurated Muriel Kauffman Theatre. Tenor Plácido Domingo gave a special concert, marking his Kansas City debut. He was accompanied by the Kansas City Symphony and Chorus, which was directed by Michael Stern. Other performers earlier in the evening included Canadian Brass, the Kansas City Ballet, Tommy Tune, Patti LuPone, with special appearances by the Lyric Opera of Kansas City, the University of Missouri – Kansas City Conservatory of Music and Dance, Robert Gibby Brand, and the Kansas City Symphony. The night culminated in the showing of "Projections", an audio-visual production by Quixotic and the Baruch/Gayton Entertainment Group. The visual element of the production was projected onto the façade of the Kauffman Center, and featured animation that made it appear as though the building was coming alive. Live dancers were suspended from the building by cables in order to interact with both the animation and the original soundtrack.

The Saturday night celebration, entitled "An Evening of Acoustical Wonder", inaugurated Helzberg Hall, with the intention of showcasing the acoustics of the hall. Violinist Itzhak Perlman and jazz singer and pianist Diana Krall both performed in concert. The evening also included pieces by the Kansas City Symphony with conductor Michael Stern, the Kansas City Symphony Chorus, and Bobby Watson & the American Jazz Museum Orchestra.

On Sunday, September 18, the Kauffman Center held a free open house for the public, and an estimated 55,000 people came through the doors that day. Scores of performances over a wide variety of genres—all of them local to Kansas City— took place in Muriel Kauffman Theatre and Helzberg Hall, as well as on four outdoor stages.

Partnerships
The Kauffman Center for the Performing Arts also provides partnership opportunities for local, regional, and student organizations in the Kansas City area. In the inaugural season, such partnerships included the Kansas City Friends of Alvin Ailey, the Harriman-Jewell Series, the Heartland Men's Chorus, the Kansas City Broadway Series, Kansas City Friends of Chamber Music, the University of Missouri – Kansas City Conservatory of Music and Dance Artist Series, The Kansas City Jazz Orchestra, the Youth Symphony of Kansas City, and Starlight Children's Theatre.

Education
The Kauffman Center's Open Doors Program is an educational program and community initiative that gives schools across the Kansas City metropolitan area the opportunity to bring children to the Kauffman Center. Through the Open Doors Transportation Fund, donations help make the cost of bringing children to performances at the Kauffman Center more affordable. Through the Open Doors Tickets Fund, donations help offset the cost of tickets for various events at the Kauffman Center, in order to provide free or low-cost performing arts experiences for program recipients supported by select non-profit agencies.

On February 13, 2012, The Grammy Museum announced that it would debut its Music Revolution Program at the Kauffman Center for the Performing Arts in June 2012. The program will host twenty-five 15- to 23-year-olds selected after an application and audition process.  The students will spend four weeks receiving intensive instruction and mentoring in their preferred genre of music and will have opportunities to rehearse and to perform at both the Kauffman Center and the nearby Sprint Center.

Arts District Garage
 Adjacent to the south side of the Kauffman Center is the city-owned and operated Arts District garage. The $47 million project was paid for in bonds. It provides covered parking for Kauffman Center attendees, with entrances on 17th Street and Wyandotte Street. The Arts District garage also has special spaces reserved for electric cars, complete with a car-charging station. The roof of the garage doubles as the landscaping for the Kauffman Center. It required 300,000 pieces of high-density foam, 3,000 tons of sand mixture, and 100,000 square feet of sod. The eco-friendly green roof was designed and constructed by local landscape architect Jeffrey L. Bruce & Company. Construction projects typically disrupt the natural ecosystem of green spaces, so Bruce and his team worked to re-establish the sustainability of the new front lawn, which consists of fescue and Reveille, a low-water-use grass. In addition to making the front of the Kauffman Center more attractive and providing an area for outdoor events, the garage's green roof reduces the destructive heat inherent to more traditional paved lots.

Terpsichore
As a part of the City of Kansas City's One Percent for Art ordinance, a mixed media art installation called "Terpsichore for Kansas City" was placed in the Arts District garage. Named after the Muse in Greek mythology who ruled over choral song and dance, the installation is a combination of original musical compositions played over speakers in the ceiling and a four-story "light organ". The light organ consists of seven acrylic tubes that encase a series of LED lights, which move in sync with the music overhead.

Notable performers and performances

 Kansas City Ballet
 Kansas City Symphony
 Lyric Opera of Kansas City
 Willie Nelson (August 16, 2012)
 Aretha Franklin
 Alvin Ailey American Dance Theater
 Ben Folds
 Diana Krall
 Idina Menzel
 Itzhak Perlman
 Joyce DiDonato
 Ladysmith Black Mambazo
 Laurie Anderson
 Lily Tomlin
 Mavis Staples
 Philip Glass
 Plácido Domingo
 Yo-Yo Ma
 2019 ACDA National Honor Choirs

See also
 List of concert halls

References

External links
 
 Kansas City Symphony
 Kansas City Ballet
 Lyric Opera of Kansas City

Performing arts centers in Missouri
Culture of Kansas City, Missouri
Buildings and structures in Kansas City, Missouri
Cultural infrastructure completed in 2011
Tourist attractions in Kansas City, Missouri
Moshe Safdie buildings
Music venues completed in 2011
Theatres completed in 2011
Crossroads, Kansas City
Theatres in Kansas City, Missouri